Madoxx Ssemanda Sematimba is the stage name for the Ugandan roots reggae musician David Amon Ssemanda Ssematimba.  He is popular in Uganda for his reggae ballads in Luganda, lives in Kampala, Uganda.

Early life
Ssematimba was born in Kampala in 1972. One of Uganda's Music Legends who have contributed so much to the Uganda's Music industry. He attended Makonzi Boarding Primary School and Busoga College Mwiri. Before choosing a path in music, Ssematimba worked as a primary school teacher. He relocated to Stockholm, Sweden in 1991, when he was 21 years old. While performing in night-clubs to pay for his computer studies, he met Kenneth "Mafo" Ssejjemba Magoye, a fellow musician, who introduced him to Aggrey Ssembatya, the proprietor of Small Axe Productions. He moved to Gothenburg where he eventually began work on his albums at Small Axe Studios. He wrote, composed, arranged, programmed, performed, co-mixed and produced all the songs on the albums while Aggrey engineered and co-mixed the albums.

Music
Maddox is a reggae musician who sings in Luganda. Released in 2000, Madoxx's first album named Tukolagane included the singles "Namagembe", "Tukolagane", "Omukwano Gwafe" and "Eddembe" . He followed up in 2006 with the album Abato, with singles like "Nakatudde", "Leka Nkulage", "Easy" and "Wansonyi". Influenced by Gregory Isaacs and Israel Vibration to name but a few. He continued to perform until 2009 when he returned to Uganda, but had reportedly left the music business a year later. Since 2014 Maddox has been performing locally. He has two children.

Discography
Tukolagane, 2001
Abato, 2006

References

1972 births
21st-century Ugandan male singers
Ugandan emigrants to Sweden
Swedish reggae musicians
Living people
Kumusha
People from Kampala
People educated at Busoga College